Bagenbaggage (foaled 1923 in Kentucky) was an American Thoroughbred multiple Derby-winning racehorse who was bred and owned by the Idle Hour Stock Farm of Edward R. Bradley. At the time a major force in Thoroughbred racing, Bradley's horses would win the Kentucky Derby four times.

Racing career
Competing as a three-year-old in 1926, Bagenbaggage's primary jockey was future Fair Grounds Racing Hall of Fame inductee, Eric Blind. With the eighteen-year-old Blind aboard, the bay colt set a new track record in winning the 1926 Louisiana Derby, won the Latonia Derby, and ran second to his stablemate in the Kentucky Derby. In a year when the Preakness Stakes was run before the Kentucky Derby, Bagenbaggage had won four straight races by three or more lengths when he inexplicably ran eighth in the Preakness behind winner, Display.

Bagenbaggage was retired to stud duty after the end of his three-year-old campaign. He was unsuccessful as a sire.

Pedigree

References

1923 racehorse births
Thoroughbred family A27
Racehorses bred in Kentucky
Racehorses trained in the United States